Rásonysápberencs is a village in Borsod-Abaúj-Zemplén county, Hungary.

History
Rásonysápberencs was created on 1 January 1938 by the unification of three villages (Abaújsáp, Rásony and Szárazberencs).

External links 
 Street map 

Populated places in Borsod-Abaúj-Zemplén County